The 1980 Oregon State Beavers football team represented Oregon State University as a member of the Pacific-10 Conference (Pac-10) during the 1980 NCAA Division I-A football season In their first season under head coach Joe Avezzano, the Beavers compiled an overall record of 0–11 with a mark of 0–8 in conference play, finished last in the Pac-10, and were outscored by their opponents 386 to 108. The team played four home games on campus at Parker Stadium in Corvallis, Oregon.

Avezzano, previously the offensive coordinator at Tennessee under Johnny Majors, was hired in late 1979; he succeeded Craig Fertig and signed a four-year contract at $40,000 per year.

Schedule

Personnel

Season summary

Arizona State
Tony Robinson - 168 yards rushing and two touchdowns on 37 attempts

References

External links
 Game program: Oregon State at Washington State – November 8, 1980 

Oregon State
Oregon State Beavers football seasons
College football winless seasons
Oregon State Beavers football